Tanzania lies in the African Great Lakes region and boasts over  of surface area that is covered by lakes. This makes up 6% of the national surface area and 88% of this area is covered by the three major lakes. Lake Victoria and Lake Tanganyika are part of the two great lakes in that nation, with Lake Victoria being the largest freshwater lake in Africa and Lake Tanganyika being the second-deepest lake in the world.

List of lakes 
The table lists information about each lake:
 Name: as listed by the World Heritage Committee
 Surface Area: Surface area of lake (note: several lakes change their surface area continually based on weather)
 Bordering Nations: Nations whose border goes through the lake
 Description: Brief description of the lake

See also 

Geography of Tanzania
Tanzania Ports Authority
Marine Services Company Limited

References

External links 

Tanzania
Lakes